Wairarapa United is a football club based in Masterton, New Zealand and are currently competing in the Central League.

Club history
The club was formed by the merger of Masterton and Carterton in 1996.

The club has competed in the Central League since 2009. In Wairarapa's first season in the Central League, the club finished sixth in the league. Wairarapa's highest finish in the league is third place which they placed in both 2010 and 2011.

The club defeated four-time champions Napier Rovers 2–1 to win the Chatham Cup in 2011. This was Wairarapa's first time appearing in the final of the Chatham Cup. After the match, long serving coach Phil Keinzley stepped down from the role of coaching Wairarapa; only to latter continue the role. Keinzley is now attempting to fund for build a $2.5 million home ground for the team in Masterton.

In 2013 Wairarapa United switched their home ground; previously using Howard Booth Park in Carterton for the 2013 Central Premier League season, they now use Memorial Park in Masterton.

Major honours

 Chatham Cup: 2011
 Rod Pelosi Challenge Trophy: 2008
 Capital Football Div One: 2005

International players
The following players have made an international cap while playing for Wairarapa United
  Seule Soromon
  Pita Rabo
  Brian Kaltack

Notes

External links
New Zealand 2004/05 Season Results
Ultimate NZ Soccer page

Association football clubs in New Zealand
Association football clubs established in 1996
Sport in the Wellington Region
Wairarapa
1996 establishments in New Zealand